Ralph Walter Moss (born May 6, 1943) is an American author whose writings promote complementary and alternative cancer treatments. In 1974, he earned a PhD in Classics from Stanford University.  Moss served as a science writer at Memorial Sloan-Kettering Cancer Center in the 1970s. He was fired in 1977 by Sloan-Kettering after publicly accusing the institution of suppressing information on laetrile, a now-discredited alternative cancer treatment. He has subsequently served on the advisory board of the Office of Alternative Medicine, and he markets Moss Reports covering various forms of alternative medicine.

His 1980 book The Cancer Industry was negatively reviewed by Quackwatch, who noted that "the book is dangerous because it may induce desperate cancer patients to abandon sound, scientifically based medical care for a worthless "alternative."

Moss's 1988 book Free Radical: Albert Szent-Györgyi and The Battle Over Vitamin C (with a preface by Studs Terkel) is a biography of the Nobel Laureate Albert Szent-Györgyi. The biography was reviewed by Ed Regis for the New York Times.

References

External links
 http://www.mossreports.com - Moss' website

American science writers
1943 births
Alternative cancer treatment advocates
Alternative medicine activists
Living people
New York University alumni
Stanford University alumni